Otto Dlabola (born 13 December 1973 in Jaroměř) is a Czech retired pair skater. Initially, he skated with Veronika Joukalová, and in 1997, he teamed up with Kateřina Beránková. Beránková and Dlabola finished 8th at the 2002 Winter Olympics. In January 2005, they announced their retirement from competition.

Dlabola is a figure skating coach. He worked with Klára Kadlecová / Petr Bidař.

Programs 
(with Beránková)

Results
GP: Champions Series / Grand Prix

Pairs with Beránková

Pairs with Joukalová

References

External links
 

Czech male pair skaters
Olympic figure skaters of the Czech Republic
Figure skaters at the 1998 Winter Olympics
Figure skaters at the 2002 Winter Olympics
1973 births
Living people
People from Jaroměř
Sportspeople from the Hradec Králové Region